FM7 may refer to:
 FM-7, a home computer by Fujitsu
 Farm to Market Road 7
 Minor seventh chord in the key of F
 Volvo FM7, a heavy truck
 Forza Motorsport 7, a video game
 The virtual instrument plug-in by Native Instruments